Grevillea deflexa is a species of flowering plant in the family Proteaceae and is endemic to inland areas of central Western Australia. It is a shrub with linear to elliptic or egg-shaped leaves, and groups of red, yellow or red and yellow flowers.

Description

Taxonomy
Grevillea deflexa was first formally described in 1883 by Ferdinand von Mueller in The Chemist and Druggist with Australasian Supplement from specimens collected near the Gascoyne River. The specific epithet (deflexa) means "bent or turned downwards", referring to the flowers.

Distribution and habitat
This grevillea grows in mulga between Laverton and the upper Gascoyne River and between the Thomas River and Mount Singleton in Avon Wheatbelt, Carnarvon, Gascoyne, Geraldton Sandplains, Murchison and Yalgoo biogeographic regions of central inland Western Australia.

Conservation status
Grevillea decurrens is listed as "not threatened" by the Western Australian Government Department of Parks and Wildlife

See also
 List of Grevillea species

References

deflexa
Endemic flora of Western Australia
Eudicots of Western Australia
Proteales of Australia
Taxa named by Ferdinand von Mueller
Plants described in 1883